The People Power Party (PPP), formerly known as the United Future Party (UFP), is a conservative political party in South Korea. Controlling the South Korean presidency, it is the second largest party in the National Assembly. PPP, along with its historic rival, the Democratic Party, make up the two largest political parties in South Korea.

The party was formed on 17 February 2020 by the merger of the Liberty Korea Party, New Conservative Party, and Onward for Future 4.0, as well as several minor parties and political organizations.

History

Background 

Due to the political scandal in 2016, President Park Geun-hye was impeached, and several MPs quit the then-ruling Saenuri Party to form the Bareun Party. The Saenuri Party changed its name to the Liberty Korea Party (LKP), but following the final impeachment of Park on 10 March 2017, it de jure lost its ruling party position. After the Democratic presidential candidate Moon Jae-in was elected on 9 May, the LKP officially became the main opposition.

Although several Bareun MPs returned to the LKP, the LKP did not recover its support, losing ground in the 2018 local elections. Its president, Hong Jun-pyo, immediately resigned to take responsibility for the serious defeat. The Bareun Party, which had merged with the smaller centrist People's Party to form the Bareunmirae Party, also faced a defeat in the local elections.

The two conservative parties held snap leadership elections. On 2 September 2018, the Bareunmirae Party elected Sohn Hak-kyu as its new president. On 27 February 2019, the Liberty Korea Party elected former Prime Minister Hwang Kyo-ahn as its new leader. Lee Un-ju, a Bareunmirae MP, quit her party and was widely expected to join the LKP but formed a new party named Onward for Future 4.0. With the exit of the Bareunmirae Party's President Sohn, other former Bareun MPs faced conflicts and founded the New Conservative Party. As a "conservative union", the Liberty Korea Party, Onward for Future 4.0, and the New Conservative Party agreed to merge and establish a new party.

The new party's name was initially set as the Grand Unified New Party (Korean: 대통합신당), but soon changed to United Future Party (Korean: 미래통합당). Park Hyung-joon, who led the merger and re-foundation, explained that the name shows support for youths and political solidarity.

Founding congress 
Following the merger and re-foundation of the 3 conservative parties into the United Future Party (UFP) on 17 February 2020, it elected the Liberty Korea Party's President Hwang Kyo-ahn as the new president. Though much of the UFP's leadership resembles that of the LKP, Vice-presidents Won Hee-ryong and Kim Young-hwan are not from the LKP.

The President of the Republic of Korea Moon Jae-in and the Democratic Party Leader Lee Hae-chan congratulated the new party's founding, but the move was not welcomed by other members. Some sources reported that the party is planning to file a lawsuit against Moon.

Yoo Seong-min, the former Bareunmirae president, did not attend the founding congress. Yoo Young-ha, who is in support of Park Geun-hye, exited the LKP before the formation of the new party.

2020–2021 
The party contested as an alliance with its sister satellite party, the Future Korea Party (FKP), in the 2020 elections. However, some UFP candidates provoked controversies for defamatory remarks, such as Cha Myong-jin and Kim Dae-ho.

The party was defeated in the election with some of the worst results historically for a conservative party in South Korea. The UFP won 103 out of 300 seats in the National Assembly, slightly over one-third of the seats. The party lost several key figures, including Oh Se-hoon, Na Kyung-won, Shim Jae-chul, and Kim Jin-tae. Party Leader Hwang Kyo-ahn, who contested for Jongno, was defeated by former Prime Minister Lee Nak-yeon. Hwang announced that he would stand down as the party president.

Following Hwang's resignation, it was reported that the party would temporarily establish the Emergency Planning Committee, led by Kim Chong-in. Several members, such as Kim Young-woo, disagreed with the establishment of the committee. Hong Jun-pyo, who showed an intention to return to the UFP, also opposed the proposal and revealed Kim's past corruption allegations.

On 8 May, Joo Ho-young was elected the UFP's Floor Leader, automatically becoming the party's interim Leader. On 22 May, the party held an election to nominate Kim Chong-in as the interim President until the next by-elections on 7 April 2021, which he accepted. The same day, the FKP announced its merger by 29 May. On 28 May, both the UFP and FKP officially declared their merger as the unified UFP.

On 13 August, Realmeter had revealed an opinion poll showing that the party has gained more supporters than the ruling Democratic Party (UFP: 36.5%–DP: 33.4%). This was the first time that a conservative party gained more support than a liberal party since the political scandal of former President Park Geun-hye in October 2016.

On 31 August, the party decided to change its name to the People Power (Korean: 국민의힘; the "Party" was added later). The party requested that the name be changed to the National Election Commission. It has been argued that the new proposed name was similar to the minor centrist People Party of Ahn Cheol-soo. There were speculations that the party was willing to form an electoral alliance with the minor opposition party in the 2021 by-elections. Jung Chung-rae, an MP of the Democratic Party, criticised the name for being too similar to a civic organisation established in 2003, where he used to serve as its first co-president.

On 2 September, the party officially changed its name to the People Power Party, its current name. The PPP declared that it would be a centrist and pragmatic party. On 14 September, the party revealed its logo and its 3 colours—red, yellow, and blue, based on its temporary decisions. These colours were officially confirmed on 23 September, although yellow was replaced with white.

On 17 September, Kwon Sung-dong, the MP for Gangneung, officially returned to the PPP, leading the party to have 104 seats. He left the party before the 2020 elections, where he ran as an independent candidate. The PPP's total seats were reverted to 103 after Park Duk-hyum, the MP for Boeun-Okcheon-Yeongdong-Goesan, quit the party on 23 September following corruption allegations. He denied all allegations related to him and his family.

On 22 December, Jeon Bong-min, the MP for Suyeong, quit the party following corruption allegations against himself and his father.

On 7 January 2021, Kim Byong-wook, the MP for Pohang South-Ulleung, withdrew from the PPP due to a controversy related to sexual harassment. The same day, Kim Tae-ho, the former Governor of South Gyeongsang and the incumbent MP for Sancheong-Hamyang-Geochang-Hapcheon, officially rejoined the party.

2021 by-elections 
Before the 2021 by-elections, the party elected the former Mayor of Seoul Oh Se-hoon as its Seoul mayoral candidate, as well as the former MP for Suyeong, Park Hyung-joon as its Busan mayoral candidate on 4 March 2021.

In the by-elections on 7 April, the party achieved an outright victory despite the government's low popularity, where both Oh and Park were elected by a large margin. Oh Se-hoon, who formerly stepped down as the Mayor of Seoul in 2011, defeated the Democratic candidate Park Young-sun and successfully came back to the position. Park Hyung-joon also defeated the Democratic candidate Kim Young-choon and was elected the Mayor of Busan, despite his several controversies, such as Haeundae LCT The Sharp. The same day, the MP for Gimcheon Song Eon-seog, faced public backlashes after it was reported that he was swearing and assaulting office workers. He quit the party on 14 April.

In opposition (2021–2022) 

On 8 April 2021, Joo Ho-young returned as the interim President of the party. He announced his intention to resign as the parliamentary leader on 16 April, adding that he would not serve until his term finishes on 29 May, but instead, until a new person is elected. The same day, the party declared that they will continue the processes to merge the minor People Party.

On 30 April, the former Mayor of Ulsan Kim Gi-hyeon was elected the new parliamentary leader of the party, defeating Kim Tae-heum, Kweon Seong-dong, and Yu Eui-dong. He served as the acting party President until the leadership election that was held on 11 June.

On 21 May, Kim Byong-wook, who quit the party in January following a sexual harassment controversy, officially returned to the PPP.

On 11 June, Lee Jun-seok was elected the new President of the party, defeating Na Kyung-won and others.

On 24 June, the party approved an independent MP Hong Jun-pyo's bid to rejoin.

On 15 July, Choi Jae-hyung, one of the potential candidate for the 2022 presidential election, officially joined the party.

On 30 July, the former Prosecutor General Yoon Suk-yeol, who was also the most favourable candidate for the 2020 presidential election, officially joined the party.

On 5 August, Yoon Sang-hyun, the MP for Incheon East-Michuhol 2nd, rejoined the party, and therefore all 4 PPP-friendly independent MPs successfully returned.

2022 presidential election and by-elections 

On 5 November 2021, Yoon Suk-yeol won PPP presidential primary, defeating Hong Jun-pyo.

In the presidential election on 9 March, Yoon was elected President of South Korea, defeating Lee Jae-myung by a margin of 0.73%. The party also won at the March 2022 by-elections that was held along with the presidential election, where the party regain 4 out of 5 constituencies. Although the party did not contest for Daegu Central-South, Lim Byung-hun, a pro-PPP independent candidate, was elected. This increased the total number of the PPP MPs, from 106 to 110.

On 8 April, Kweon Seong-dong was elected parliamentary leader of the People Power Party, defeating Cho Hae-jin.

On 18 April 2022, the minor People Party merged into the PPP.

Return to the government (since 2022) 
Following Yoon's inauguration as the President on 9 May, the PPP faced the local elections in 1 June, which they achieved an outright victory.

Later, the new party leader Lee Jun-seok, who took a critical stance toward the president, was expelled from the party.Through the text leak incident that occurred later, it was possible to understand the president's uncomfortable intentions toward the former party leader.
The rules of the party convention were limited to 100% of the party member vote. Yoo Seong-min, a moderate candidate, criticized the change as a way to discredit himself, who is ranked first in public opinion polls. After the Hanbyeon rule change, a number of far-right people who insisted on the conspiracy theory of fraudulent elections ran for the PPP primary.

In the party leadership race, the president was criticized for attempting to influence the primary. The rule account for 100% party vote to prevent the election of a candidate critical of the president was also made after the president addressed party lawmakers.

Na Kyung-won, who wanted to run for the primary, declared that he would not run. It was interpreted that this was due to pressure from the president. Candidate Seung-Min Yoo, who was judged to have no chance of winning due to the rule change, also gave up running for the primary. Criticisms were raised in various media outlets that the president intervened excessively in the primary by not maintaining neutrality and excessively pushing certain candidates.

After the resignation of Na Gyeong-won, who was ahead in the public opinion of the party's supporters, the two-way structure of Ahn Cheol-soo and Kim Gi-hyeon hardened. Even in this situation, the presidential office threw a friendly message to candidate Kim Ki-hyun or used the expression 'enemy' in favor of Ahn Cheol-soo, showing an attitude that seemed to support candidate Kim Ki-hyun, causing controversy.

Candidate Gyeong-Won Na declared his support for Candidate Ki-Hyun Kim.

In addition, members of the pro-Presidential faction, represented by "Pro-Yoon" who supports candidate Ki-Hyun Kim, said that Cheol-Soo Ahn took a friendly stance toward progressive intellectuals in the past, saying that he was "a person who respects communists" and "pro-North Korea leftists." They are supporting Ahn Cheol-soo," etc., which caused controversy by attacking the color theory.

The final four candidates for the party representative were Cheon Ah-ram, Hwang Kwan-gwan, Kim Ki-hyun, and Ahn Cheol-soo, who advanced to the final contest.

Regarding the characteristics of the candidates, Ah-ram Cheon is pro-Lee Jun-seok and is critical of the president, Hwang Kyo-ahn has far-right ideologies, supports the fraudulent election conspiracy theory, and denies the impeachment of President Park Geun-hye, and Ahn Cheol-soo takes a neutral stance toward the president and is evaluated as broadly moderately expandable thanks to his past history from a liberal party. Kim Gi-hyeon has the advantage of being able to maintain a good relationship with the presidential office, but there is also criticism that it can make the separation between the party and the presidential office insufficient.

On 8 March 2023, Kim Gi-hyeon was elected President of the party.ln the primary for the supreme council, all five out of five candidates who were friendly to President Yoon Suk-yeol were elected. Non-Yoon Seok-yeol candidates inside the party criticized that the primary was conducted very unfairly.

Ideology 
The People Power Party can be seen as a big tent political party, There are politicians with various ideologies in the PPP, but they are usually referred to as figures rather than ideologies. The party is considered a right-wing conservative political party in South Korea, but inside, it is widely distributed from moderate Republicanism to extremists who support Neo-McCarthyism.
Currently, the party is dominated by the faction friendly to the president (pro-Yoon), and there are neutral to the president (non-Yoon) and critical to the president (anti-Yoon).

PPP defines its main conservative values as "jayu-minjujuui", and its supporters also tend to define PPP as "jayujuui political party". Foreign media tend to paraphrase the "jayujuui" claimed by South Korean conservatives as "libertarian", as the PPP-backed "jayujuui" has little to do with "liberal" in the United States political context. However, PPP's libertarianism is mainly confined to the economic sphere. In 2022, the Ministry of Education under the PPP's ruling Yoon Suk Yeoln government changed the term "democracy" to "liberal democracy" in the new textbook to be revised in 2025, but at the same time removed all the terms "LGBT". PPP is classified as a bosujuui party, and DPK is classified as a jayujuui or sahoe-jayujuui party.

Main factions 
Currently, there are pro-Yoon and non-Yoon factions in the party. However, there are cases where factions are divided into pro-Yoon, non-Yoon, and anti-Yoon.

The pro-Yoon is a faction that is (almost unconditionally) friendly to the President. They strictly follow the will of the President (Yoon Shim). The non-Yoon tries to have a good relationship with Yoon Seok-yeol, but he is a new force who pursues his own path to some extent. The non-Yoon faction has a very bad relationship with President Yoon and often clash.

Pro-Yoon 

"Chin-Yoon" is a political group. It is evaluated that the current PPP is leading a conservative movement.
At present, both party power and supreme council members have overwhelming control, and are mainly supported by older party members. Chin-Yoon is national conservatism, and is sometimes referred to as right-wing to far-right. If a representative of the National Assembly doesn't take a friendly stance to the president, following the 'president's will', they may be criticized by other pro-Yoons. Representatively, it was argued that former lawmaker Na Gyeong-won was criticized for disobeying the president's intention not to run for the party convention. After Yoon took over the party, unlike the previous leadership that distanced itself from the far right, he made conservative statements and appealed to the far right. After Chin-Yoon seized power, many conspiracy theorists of fraudulent elections ran for primary elections.

Non-Yoon 

"Bi-Yoon" is referred to as a conservative group critical of Yoon Suk-yeol.
People who are neutral to President Bi Yun-jung are classified as non-Yoon and more critical personnel as "ban-Yoon". People from the New Conservative Party are leading the way. They are ideologically inconsistent except against Yoon Suk-yeol, and there are economic liberals and paternalistic conservatives. Bi-Yoon is also economically liberal, but moderates like Yoo Seung-min are more favorable to welfare than the PPP mainstream.

Some of them show moderate (culturally liberal) views than conservative factions within DPK on cultural issues such as LGBT, and are criticized by right-wing Christian media. However, there is an unfriendly view of feminism.

Political positions 
The People's Power Party is mainly labeled a right-wing party, but has also been labeled far-right particularly during its establishment. 

Following the election of a Lee Jun-seok as party leader, the People's Power Party attempted to move towards a more moderate political alignment, but these reforms were unsuccessful due to opposition from conservatives within the party. President Yoon Suk-yeol and Lee have feuded over social media, leading to Lee being ousted from the party by a pro-Yoon (called 친윤 or 윤핵관) faction within the party. After Lee Jun-seok was ousted in a text message with the floor leader, the President Yoon stated “Our party is doing well. We have to keep doing this,” and “It has changed since the party leader, who internal gunpowder, changed,” he said, expressing his unpleasant feelings towards former leader Lee. Following Lee's ousting, the People's Power Party began to shift to the right again, bringing about comparisons to the former Liberty Korea Party.

Economic policies 
In the past, conservative political parties in South Korea also showed economic interventionism due to Park Chung-hee's influence. However, the current PPP has become more economically liberal, and the British journal The Economist described PPP as "fiscal conservative" in 'The World Head 2022'. Yoon Suk-yeol is influenced by Milton Friedman and supports economically liberal polices.

Social policies 
The PPP has a socially conservative tendency and advocates sound budgeting, public safety, a focus on providing jobs, traditional family values, and national patriotism. Most PPP politicians oppose LGBT rights. 

Some media outlets criticized a part of the PPP's young politicians' negative attitude toward feminism.

PPP opposes DPK's policy of officially attempting to regulate dog meat consumption. Yang Joon-woo, a spokesman for PPP, criticized, "The state does not have the right to regulate individual tastes or eating habits".

The PPP is advocating for the abolishment of the "Korean age" and the standardization of age counting in South Korea. Lee Yong-ho, the chief of Yoon Suk-yeol 's transition committee, said the different age counting methods in the country creates "persistent confusion" and "unnecessary social and economic costs".

Rights of immigrants and foreigners 
As South Korea's low birthrate intensifies, key politicians in the PPP have moved away from the conservative immigration policies of the past and began to support a more liberal approach. The conservative-libertarian Yoon Suk-yeol government supports the creation of an "immigration office" (이민청) that has been discussed and failed since the past liberal Kim Dae-jung government.

On the other hand, the foreign voting rights issue has changed to a more conservative position than in the past. The PPP argues that foreigners from countries that do not grant voting rights to South Koreans living abroad should be deprived of all voting rights. PPP's conservative stance on foreign voting rights is also criticized by South Korean liberals as "retrograde democracy".

Diplomatic politics 
South Korea is one of the most pro-American countries among Northeast Asian countries, especially the conservative PPP's pro-American tendency is stronger, but differences in diplomatic views may occur depending on individual party members.

Diplomatic positions on China are not clearly defined, but are usually critical. However, 'conservatives' in South Korea place more importance on economic pragmatism than anti-imperialist 'liberals', so they try to avoid excessive conflicts with China in Cross-Strait relations, Korean culture and Korean history. However, apart from PPP's actual foreign policy, there is a controversy that PPP politically exploits anti-Chinese sentiment in the sense of internal politics and culture. There is a controversy that PPP's anti-Chinese sentiment leads to hate speech and violence against Chinese people.

In diplomatic relations with Japan, the PPP is not unconditionally conciliatory to Japan, but it shows a relatively conciliatory dovish view compared to the hawkish views of DPK politicians. South Korean liberals and leftists have criticized the PPP, which supports military cooperation with Japan, as "Chinilpa" (친일파) or "pro-Japanese far-right" (친일극우), because liberals and leftists has an old "victim sentiment" against Japanese militarism.

PPP does not seek direct compensation or apology from the Japanese government and companies for victims of forced labor, a war crime committed by the Empire of Japan government and Japanese companies during World War II, but instead expresses its stance to receive voluntary donations from South Korean companies through the foundation. DPK criticized this, saying, "It tramples on the victims and represents Japan's companies interests".

PPP supports cooperation with Israel in many areas, and PPP politicians are very positive about the FTA with Israel promoted by the liberal DPK. Koreans and Israel's main ethnic group Jews, have something in common that they were victims of war crimes by Japan and Germany during World War II. Some South Korean conservative or liberal media outlets compare Koreans' historical sorrow to Jews' 'Diaspora' (디아스포라).

North Korea 
The PPP is fiercely anti-communist and advocates a hawkish policy against North Korea. This has let them to usually perform well electorally in constituencies that border the Korean Demilitarized Zone.

Major PPP politicians are positive about the possibility of South Korea having nuclear weapons on its own, in order to counter the threat of North Korea's nuclear weapons. This position contrasts with South Korean liberals and progressives who oppose nuclear weapons based on pacifism.

Criticism 
Some right-wing young politicians of the PPP, South Korea's largest conservative party, are based on the support of the Idaenam. They have also been criticized by major South Korean media and some foreign media because they are showing strong anti-feminist tendencies. The left-of-center/liberal newspaper Hankyoreh compared Lee Jun-seok, a former PPP leader, with far-right populism in Europe. The JoongAng Ilbo, a moderate conservative journalist, also described Lee negatively. Because of these intraparty hawks, the PPP has been referred to as "far-right" by The Nation, an American progressive magazine.

However, in the South Korean political position, Lee Jun-seok was known as a politician who distanced himself from the Liberty Korea Party-style authoritarian far-right politics. After the new party leader was ousted, hard-line conservatives who were unconditionally loyal to the president took over the party and were criticized for moving in the far-right direction of the former Liberty Korea Party.

They are also often criticised for appropriating the term "liberalism" (자유주의). Despite the Democratic Party of Korea being the profound ideological basis on liberalism in South Korea, PPP often use their own interpretation of "liberalism", which is closely related to right-libertarianism to attack DPK as "authoritarian" or "socialist". However, the PPP's position on past Korean dictators still remains favourable and its politicians often deny massacres of the past committed by South Korean authoritarian regimes. This has made them regularly failing to win support from the southwestern Jeolla provinces as they were direct victims from discriminatory policies during the dictatorships, most notably during the Gwangju Massacre.

Leadership

Leaders 
Note:  – as head of Emergency Response Committee

Floor Leaders

Secretary-General

Election results

President

Legislature

Local

By-elections

See also 

 Angry young man (South Korea)
 Fiscal conservatism (재정보수주의) - In South Korea, the term is not used well and is mainly expressed as "economic liberalism" (경제적 자유주의) or "fiscal soundness" (재정건전성).
 Democratic Republican Party
 Independent Democratic Union (Chile)
 Liberal Party (Brazil, 2006)
 Liberal Democratic Party (Japan)

Notes

References

External links
Official website

 
2020 establishments in South Korea
Anti-Chinese sentiment in South Korea
Anti-communism in South Korea
Anti-communist parties
Conservative parties in South Korea
Discrimination against LGBT people in South Korea
Libertarian conservative parties
National conservative parties
Political parties established in 2020
Political parties in South Korea
Social conservative parties
Right-libertarianism
Right-wing parties in Asia
Right-wing politics in South Korea
Right-wing populist parties